

In England, Sites of Special Scientific Interest (SSSIs) are designated by Natural England, which is responsible for protecting England's natural environment. Designation as an SSSI gives legal protection to the most important wildlife and geological sites. As of March 2019, there are 65 sites designated in East Sussex, 45 of which have been designated for their biological interest, 15 for their geological interest, and 5 for both biological and geological interest.

Six sites are Special Areas of Conservation, two are Special Protection Areas, two are  Ramsar sites, twenty are Geological Conservation Review sites, ten are Nature Conservation Review sites, five are national nature reserves, ten are local nature reserves, six are in Areas of Outstanding Natural Beauty, two are on the Register of Historic Parks and Gardens and three contain scheduled monuments. Nine sites are managed by the Sussex Wildlife Trust and one by the Royal Society for the Protection of Birds.

East Sussex is a county in South East England. It is bordered by Kent to the north-east, West Sussex to the west, Surrey to the north and the English Channel to the south.

Interest
B = site of biological interest
G = site of geological interest

Public access
FP = access to footpaths through the site only
NO = no public access to site
PL = public access at limited times
PP = public access to part of site
YES = public access to all or most of the site

Other classifications
AONB = Area of Outstanding Natural Beauty
GCR = Geological Conservation Review
LNR = Local nature reserve
NCR = Nature Conservation Review site
NNR = National nature reserve
NT = National Trust
Ramsar = Ramsar site, an internationally important wetland site
RHPG= Register of Historic Parks and Gardens of Special Historic Interest in England
RSPB = Royal Society for the Protection of Birds
SAC = Special Area of Conservation
SM = Scheduled monument
SPA = Special Protection Area under the European Union Directive on the Conservation of Wild Birds
SWT = Suffolk Wildlife Trust
WWT = Wildfowl & Wetlands Trust

Sites

See also

List of Local Nature Reserves in East Sussex
Sussex Wildlife Trust

Notes

References

Sources

 
East Sussex
East Sussex-related lists